Nihar Kanti Chakma is an Indian politician representing West Tuipui in the Mizoram Legislative Assembly since 1988. He is a member of the Indian National Congress. Nihar Kanti Chakma was born to Late Hari Kristo Chakma, a resident of Nunsury village and a former MLA of the same constituency. Earlier, he held the post of Minister of Veterinary & Rehabilitation department in Mizoram. He made his political debut as a member of the Mizoram Legislative Assembly in 1988 after his father's death. Since then, he is the sole undefeated MLA from Mizoram.

References

External links
 https://myneta.info/mizoram2018/candidate.php?candidate_id=288
 https://mizoram.nic.in/gov/mla.htm
 https://www.chakmadistrictcongress.org/post/hon-ble-mla-dangu-nihar-kanti-chakma-to-visit-kamalanagar-on-15th-november-2021

Indian National Congress politicians from Mizoram
Chakma people
Indian Buddhists
People from Lunglei district
Living people
Mizoram MLAs 2013–2018
Mizoram MLAs 2018–2023
1969 births
People from Mizoram